The Amapá gubernatorial election was held on 5 October 2014 to elect the next governor of the state of Amapá. Since no candidate received more than 50% of the vote, a second-round runoff election was held on 26 October.  Governor Camilo Capiberibe ran for a second term and was forced into a runoff with former Governor Waldez Góes.

Candidates
Waldez 12 (PDT) - former Governor of Amapá (elected in 2002, 2006)
Papaléo Paes 12 (PP) - doctor; former Senator (2003-2011)
Genival Cruz 16 (PSTU) - bus driver; union leader
Professor Wilamo 16 (PSTU) - high school teacher
Décio Gomes 21 (PCB) - business director
Paulo Gaia 21 (PCB) - high school teacher
Jorge Amanajás 23 (PPS) - former State Deputy (elected in 1998, 2002, 2006)
Daiana Ramos 23 (PMN) - President, Associação Universidade de Samba Boêmios do Laguinho
Camilo Capiberibe 40 (PSB) - incumbent Governor (elected in 2010); former State Deputy (elected in 2006)
Rinaldo Martins 40 (PSOL) - doctor
Lucas Barreto 55 (PSD) - Macapá Councillor (elected in 2012); former State Deputy (elected in 1990, 1994, 1998, 2002)
Wagner Gomes 55 (SD) - lawyer
Bruno Mineiro 70 (PTdoB) - State Deputy (elected in 2010)
Aline Gurgel 70 (PR) - Macapá Councillor (elected in 2012)

Coalitions

Opinion Polling

Results

References

2014 Brazilian gubernatorial elections
Amapá gubernatorial elections
October 2014 events in South America